This is a list of memorials to James A. Garfield, the 20th president of the United States.

Artworks 

 James Garfield Memorial in Philadelphia, Pennsylvania
 James A. Garfield Monument in Washington, D.C.
 Statue of James A. Garfield (Cincinnati)
 Statue of James A. Garfield (U.S. Capitol)

Buildings 

 Garfield Building in Cleveland, Ohio
 James A. Garfield Memorial in Cleveland, Ohio, the final resting place of President and Lucretia Garfield

Cities, towns, or villages 

 Garfield, Jefferson County, Idaho
 Garfield, Illinois
 Garfield, Indiana
 Garfield, Kansas
 Garfield, Kentucky
 Garfield, Minnesota
 Garfield, Missouri
 Garfield, New Jersey
 Garfield, Mahoning County, Ohio
 Garfield (Pittsburgh), Pennsylvania
 Garfield, Virginia, a former post office and locale in Springfield, Virginia
 Garfield, Washington

Counties 

 Garfield County, Colorado
 Garfield County, Montana
 Garfield County, Nebraska
 Garfield County, Oklahoma
 Garfield County, Utah
 Garfield County, Washington

Educational institutions 

 James A. Garfield High School in East Los Angeles, California
 James A. Garfield High School in Akron, Ohio
 James A. Garfield High School in Garrettsville, Ohio
 James A. Garfield High School in Seattle, Washington

Topographical features 

 Garfield Creek in Garfield, Victoria, Australia
 Garfield Lake in Hubbard County, Minnesota
 Garfield Mountain in King County, Washington

Parks and public spaces 

 Garfield Park in Chicago, Illinois
 Garfield Park in Indianapolis, Indiana

Other 
 James A. Garfield, a three-masted bark

See also
 Presidential memorials in the United States

Cultural depictions of James A. Garfield
Garfield, James A.
Garfield, James A.